The Niederflur-Express-Triebzug (NExT) is an electric multiple unit light commuter train developed by Stadler Rail for the Swiss Regionalverkehr Bern-Solothurn (RBS) railway operator. With a top speed of 120 km/h, it is the fastest metre gauge train in Switzerland.

Six three-carriage trains were delivered in 2009 at a cost of 53.4 million CHF and are used for express service between Bern and Solothurn. In 2013, 6 additional trains were delivered.

The Neue Zürcher Zeitung commented favourably on the train's angular design and use of interior space. It commended RBS for setting "new standards of design and comfort" in Swiss commuter transport with the NExT.

External links
 NExT website by RBS

References

Multiple units of Switzerland
Stadler Rail multiple units
Regionalverkehr Bern-Solothurn